The Sinnamary is a river in French Guiana. It rises in the center of the country, flowing north until it reaches the Atlantic Ocean near the town of Sinnamary. Its longest tributary is the Koursibo. The Petit-Saut Dam was built near Petit-Saut between 1989 and 1994.

References

Rivers of French Guiana
Ramsar sites in France
Rivers of France